741 Naval Air Squadron (741 NAS) was a Naval Air Squadron of the Royal Navy's Fleet Air Arm. It was initially active, between 1943 and 1945 as an Observer Training Squadron at RNAS Arbroath (HMS Condor). It reformed at RNAS St. Merryn (HMS Vulture), as an Operational Flying Training Unit in 1946.

History of 741 NAS

Observer Training School (1943 - 1945)
741 Naval Air Squadron formed at RNAS Arbroath (HMS Condor) as an Observer Training Squadron, part of No.2 Observer Training School on 1 March 1943, equipped with Fairey Swordfish aircraft. It disbanded on 19 March 1945 at RNAS Arbroath.

Operational Flying Training Unit (1946 - 1947)
741 NAS reformed at RNAS St Merryn (HMS Vulture) on 12 August 1946 as an Operational Flying Training Unit. It operated Fairey Firefly FR.I, Supermarine Seafire L Mk.III and North American Harvard III. On 25 November 1947 it disbanded.

Aircraft flown

The squadron has flown a number of different aircraft types, including:
 Fairey Swordfish (1943)
 Fairey Firefly FR.I (1946 - 1947)
 Supermarine Seafire L Mk.III (1946 - 1947)
 North American Harvard III (1946 - 1947)

Fleet Air Arm Bases 
741 NAS operated from two air bases:
Royal Naval Air Squadron ARBROATH (1 March 1943 - 19 March 1945)
Royal Naval Air Station ST MERRYN (12 August 1946 - 25 November 1947)

Commanders
741 NAS had a number of commanding officers during its two active periods:
 Lt-Cdr (A) O. H. Cantrill, RNVR (Mar 1943 - Mar 1944)
 Lt-Cdr (A) R. McA. Strtto, RNVR (Mar 1944 - Mar 1945)
 Lt-Cdr S. G. Cooper, RN (Aug 1946 - Aug 1947)
 Lt-Cdr T. W. Harrington, DSC RN (Aug 1947 - Nov 1947)

References

Citations

Bibliography

700 series Fleet Air Arm squadrons
Military units and formations established in 1943
Military units and formations of the Royal Navy in World War II